Sir William Ogle Carr (13 November 1802 – 24 April 1856) was the ninth Chief Justice of Ceylon and eighth King's Advocate of Ceylon. He was appointed on 17 April 1854, succeeding Anthony Oliphant, and was Chief Justice until 1856. He was succeeded by William Carpenter Rowe.

Carr took J. G. Hildebrand on the bench. In the following year he functioned as Senior Puisne Justice before being confirmed in the post. When Chief Justice Oliphant retired in 1854 Carr took the middle seat.

References

Chief Justices of British Ceylon
19th-century Sri Lankan people
Sri Lankan people of British descent
British expatriates in Sri Lanka
19th-century British people
1802 births
1856 deaths
Puisne Justices of the Supreme Court of Ceylon
Attorneys General of British Ceylon